Álvaro Jordão Pinto Silva Cardoso (born 14 October 1996), known as Jordão Cardoso, is a Portuguese professional footballer who plays as a winger for Sanjoanense.

References

External links
Player Profile at foradejogo.net

1996 births
Living people
People from Viana do Castelo
Portuguese footballers
Portuguese expatriate footballers
Portuguese expatriate sportspeople in Cyprus
Expatriate footballers in Cyprus
Portuguese expatriate sportspeople in Bulgaria
Expatriate footballers in Bulgaria
Association football midfielders
SC Vianense players
ASIL Lysi players
Sport Benfica e Castelo Branco players
PFC Cherno More Varna players
First Professional Football League (Bulgaria) players
Cypriot Second Division players
Sportspeople from Viana do Castelo District